Francesco Bertollini (born 4 July 1992), better known as Franco126, is an Italian singer-songwriter.

He rose to fame in 2017, as part of the duo Carl Brave x Franco126, with the album Polaroid. Two years later, he released his first solo studio album, Stanza singola, which includes the single with the same title, recorded as a duet with Tommaso Paradiso. The album entered the top ten in Italy and was certified platinum by FIMI.

Franco126's second studio set, Multisala, became his first number-one album in May 2021. The album spawned singles including "Che senso ha" and "Blue Jeans", which features vocals by Calcutta. To promote the album, Franco126 embarked on a tour which included shows at the Mediolanum Forum in Milan and at the PalaLottomatica in Rome.

References

External links
Franco126 at Allmusic
 

1992 births
Living people
Italian male singer-songwriters
Singers from Rome
21st-century Italian  male singers